Krzysztof Urbański (born 17 October 1982, Pabianice, Poland) is a Polish conductor and composer.

Urbański studied conducting at the Fryderyk Chopin University of Music in Warsaw, where his teachers included Antoni Wit, who one year after leaving this position considered him as the best of the fifteen disciples he had at the institution. In 2007, he won First Prize of the Prague Spring International Conducting Competition, and also graduated from the Chopin Music Academy, Warsaw in the same year.  He subsequently served as an assistant conductor to the Warsaw Philharmonic Orchestra, from 2007 to 2009.

In September 2009, Urbański made his first guest-conducting appearance with the Trondheim Symphony Orchestra.  That same month, the orchestra named him its next chief conductor, effective with the 2010-2011 season, with an initial contract of 3 years.  Following an extension of his initial contract for another 2 years to 2015, in May 2014, his Trondheim contract was further extended to 2017.  He concluded his Trondheim tenure at the close of the 2016-2017 season.  From 2015 to 2021 Urbański served as principal guest conductor of the NDR Elbphilharmonie Orchestra.

In April 2010, Urbański first guest-conducted the Indianapolis Symphony Orchestra (ISO).  He was subsequently engaged for a return appearance in June 2010 at the orchestra's summer series, "Symphony on the Prairie".  Based on these two appearances, the ISO named Urbański its 7th music director, effective 1 September 2011, with an initial contract of 4 years.  In parallel, the Jacobs School of Music at Indiana University Bloomington appointed Urbański as an adjunct professor of music, with a focus on orchestral conducting, effective with the 2011-2012 academic year.  In September 2013, the ISO announced the extension of Urbański's contract as music director through the 2017-2018 season.  In May 2019, the ISO announced that Urbanski is to conclude his tenure as its music director at the close of the 2020-2021 season.

In April 2013, Urbański became principal guest conductor of the Tokyo Symphony Orchestra, with an initial contract of 3 years.

Urbański and his wife Joanna maintain residences in Warsaw and in Indianapolis.

References

External links 
 Official website of Krzysztof Urbański
 Harrison Parrott agency page on Krzysztof Urbański
 Anna Iwanicka-Nijakowska, profile of Krzysztof Urbański, Culture.pl website

Living people
Polish conductors (music)
Male conductors (music)
1982 births
21st-century conductors (music)
21st-century male musicians
People from Pabianice
21st-century Polish musicians